Robert M. Pifferini Sr. (October 1, 1922 – December 9, 2017) was an American football center who played one season with the Detroit Lions. He played college football at San Jose State University and attended high school at Modesto High School in Modesto, California. He is the father of Bob Pifferini, also a professional football player. He was married to Gaynell until her death in 2009. Pifferini died on December 9, 2017, at the age of 95.

References

1922 births
2017 deaths
American football centers
Detroit Lions players
San Jose State Spartans football players
Players of American football from California
People from Oakdale, California